John Ellerton Stocks M.D., F.L.S (1822–1854), was a native of Cottingham in the East Riding of Yorkshire, England, who distinguished himself as a botanist in India.

India
He joined the Bombay Medical Staff in the 1840s.  For most part of his service, he was posted in Sind.

Sind
While in Sindh he served as vaccinator and inspector of drugs.

In 1853, botanist George Bentham published Stocksia, which is a genus of flowering plants from Iran, Afghanistan and Pakistan belonging to the family Sapindaceae and named after John Ellerton Stocks.

References

See also
 John Ellerton Stock on Wikispecies

1822 births
1854 deaths
People from Cottingham, East Riding of Yorkshire
English botanists